Lionel Dauriac (19 November 1847 – 26 May 1923) was a French philosopher and musicologist.

Dauriac was born in Brest, the son of an admiral. He was professor of musical aesthetics at the Sorbonne between 1896 and 1903. He died 26 May 1923 in Paris. An internationally minded music critic, he wrote biographies of Gioachino Rossini, Richard Wagner and Giacomo Meyerbeer.

Works
 Des notions de matière et de force dans les sciences de la nature, 1878.
 Croyance et realité, 1889.
 Rossini: biographie critique, 1902.
 Essai sur l'esprit musical, 1904.
 Meyerbeer, 1913.
 Contingence et rationalisme; pages d'histoire et de doctrine, 1924.

References

Writers from Brest, France
1847 births
1923 deaths
19th-century French philosophers
20th-century French philosophers
19th-century French musicologists
20th-century French musicologists
French biographers
École Normale Supérieure alumni
Lycée Lakanal teachers
19th-century musicologists